WPOB (88.5 FM) is a high school radio station licensed to Plainview, New York. WPOB is a community radio station funded by the Plainview-Old Bethpage Central School District and has been broadcasting since 1972. WPOB is broadcast by students at Plainview – Old Bethpage John F. Kennedy High School partaking in a three-year course in radio engineering, producing and broadcasting. The station airs from 7:00 a.m. to 2:30 p.m. weekdays and shares time with Syosset High School's WKWZ in Syosset, New York.

Early days 
WPOB was a project sponsored by Plainview-Old Bethpage School Board member Joseph Scholnick, a sound-effects pioneer of the 1950s broadcast radio scene, who also was the original FCC licensed engineer responsible for regulatory compliance at the station.  Student run, with oversight from Dr. Louis Brown, WPOB initially broadcast, almost exclusively, news and educational programming.  By the mid-1970s however, WPOB's programming format had shifted to include student-generated content and popular music programming, eventually adding more modern Rock & Roll content.

The content produced by students was composed, directed and engineered as a learning experience and included regular episodic comedy, such as "The Adventures of Captain Kwizdo" (a thinly veiled homage to the "Mark Time" routine performed by the professional comedy troupe 'Firesign Theater'), a weekly sports review (which mimicked the styling of the famous sportscaster Howard Cosell), alternative music and current events programming, such as "Music You Dont Know From a Guy You Don't Care About", and various informational news magazines. Students were also encouraged to produce their own promotional material, jingles, and other content. Often recruiting school music students, actors, and athletes to contribute content such as jingles and other broadcast promotions for their work.

WPOB Today 
The station updated their music library and computer systems in 2016 to include a mix of new popular music and all-time favorites. This update was spearheaded by past assistant station managers Colby Kusinitz and Joe Liszovics.

WPOB DJs get approximately 40 minutes to do what they want with their shows, the station also livestreams music, public service announcements (PSA), and the news every Friday to WPOB.com. The station is a member of the Emergency Alert System (EAS) and will alert the greater Plainview area of any dangerous situations. The newest update to the WPOB station is a TV being added to their booth and over 3,000 CDs donated to the station.

The station's programming is student generated and there are courses available to further the student knowledge on broadcast communications. WPOB is run through the English Department at POB-JFK High School.

WPOB now transmits to the local community through a RoIP system to provide the best quality sound, this update was conducted in July 2020.

See also 
 WKWZ

References

External links 

POB
Plainview, New York
Old Bethpage, New York
Mass media in Nassau County, New York